This is a list of vice presidents of the United States by other offices (either elected or appointive) held, either before or after service as the vice president.

Federal government

Executive branch

President

Cabinet secretaries

Ambassadors

Other federal appointees

Judicial branch

No vice presidents have yet served in the judicial branch.

Legislative branch

Senators 

A number of future and former vice presidents served together while in the Senate:
King served with R. Johnson (1819–1829), Van Buren (1821–1828), Tyler (1827–1836), Dallas (1831–1833), Calhoun (1832–1843, 1848–1850) and Hamlin (1848–1852). Hamlin later served with Wilson (1855–1861; 1869–1873) and A. Johnson (1857–1861; 1875). Wilson and A. Johnson, during their continued service with each other (1861–1862), also served with Breckinridge (1861). Wilson also served with Hendricks (1863–1869).
Curtis served with Barkley (1927–1929). Barkley later served with Truman (1935–1945), Humphrey (1955–1956) and L. Johnson (1955–1956). Humphrey and L. Johnson, who had served together before and after their service with Barkley (1949–1961), also served with Nixon (1950–1953). Humphrey would be succeeded by Mondale and would later serve with him (1971–1976) and Biden (1973–1978). Biden later served with Quayle (1981–1989) and Gore (1985–1993).

Members of the House of Representatives 

A number of future vice presidents served in the House together:
R. Johnson served with King (1811–1816), Calhoun (1811–1817), Tyler (1816–1819) and Fillmore (1833–1835).
Hamlin served with A. Johnson (1843–1847). Breckinridge and Hendricks served together (1851–1855), as well as with A. Johnson (1851–1853).
Colfax served with Wheeler (1861–1863). Wheeler later served with Stevenson (1875–1877). Stevenson later served with Morton (1879–1881).
Sherman served with Curtis (1893–1907) and Garner (1903–1909). Garner later served with Barkley (1913–1927).
Nixon served with L. Johnson (1947–1949) and Ford (1949–1950). Ford later served with Bush (1967–1971).
Gore served with Quayle (1977–1981) and Cheney (1979–1985).

Continental Congress

State government

Governors

State legislators
 See below for information about pre-1776 colonial offices held.

Other statewide offices

Municipal government

Foreign governments

Colonial, Confederate legislators, and Confederate Cabinet

Lost races 
Other than immediate re-election to the vice presidency

 
United States
Other